Nordia is a moshav shitufi in central Israel. Located in the Sharon plain near Netanya and the HaSharon Junction, it falls under the jurisdiction of Lev HaSharon Regional Council.

History

Before the 20th century the area formed part of the Forest of Sharon and was part of the lands of the village of Khirbat Bayt Lid. It was an open woodland dominated by Mount Tabor Oak, which extended from Kfar Yona in the north to Ra'anana in the south. The local Arab inhabitants traditionally used the area for pasture, firewood and intermittent cultivation. The intensification of settlement and agriculture in the coastal plain during the 19th century led to deforestation and subsequent environmental degradation.

In 1926 the American Zion Commonwealth announced plans to establish a new agricultural settlement to be named "Nordia" in memory of the Zionist leader Max Nordau. Land was sold in the United States for this purpose, but the plan did not come to fruition.

Nordia was founded on 2 November 1948 by demobilised Irgun and Betar soldiers, members of the Herut movement, on the land of the depopulated Palestinian village of Khirbat Bayt Lid, The founders came from two units – Margolim based in Kfar Yona and Wedgwood (named after Josiah Wedgwood) based in Mishmar HaYarden.

In 1994 a new neighborhood, Neot Nordia, was established.

References

External links
Village website 

Moshavim
Populated places established in 1948
Populated places in Central District (Israel)
1948 establishments in Israel